Transportation Building may refer to:
 Transportation Building (Chicago), Illinois, United States; demolished
 Transportation Building (Manhattan), New York City, New York, United States
 Transportation Building (Ottawa), Ontario, Canada
 Transportation Building (Toronto), Ontario, Canada; demolished